The Cavalese cable car crash, also known as the Cermis massacre , occurred on February 3, 1998, near the Italian town of Cavalese, a ski resort in the Dolomites some  northeast of Trento. Twenty people were killed when a United States Marine Corps EA-6B Prowler aircraft, flying too low and against regulations, in order for the pilots to "have fun" and "take videos of the scenery", cut a cable supporting a cable car of an aerial lift.

The pilot, Captain Richard J. Ashby, and his navigator, Captain Joseph Schweitzer, were put on trial in the United States and found not guilty of involuntary manslaughter and negligent homicide. Later they were found guilty of obstruction of justice and conduct unbecoming an officer and a gentleman for having destroyed a videotape recorded from the plane, and were dismissed from the Marine Corps. The disaster, and the subsequent acquittal of the pilots, strained relations between the U.S. and Italy.

Details of the disaster

On February 3, 1998, an EA-6B Prowler, BuNo (bureau number) 163045, 'CY-02', callsign Easy 01, an electronic warfare aircraft belonging to Marine Tactical Electronic Warfare Squadron 2 (VMAQ-2) of the United States Marine Corps, was on a low-altitude training mission. At 15:13 local time it struck the cables supporting the aerial lift from Cavalese.

The plane had wing and tail damage, but was able to return to Aviano Air Base.

Victims 

Among the twenty killed, nineteen passengers and one operator, were seven Germans, five Belgians, three Italians, two Poles, two Austrians, and one Dutch.

Reactions
U.S. President Bill Clinton offered an official apology and promised monetary compensation. Thomas M. Foglietta, U.S. Ambassador to Italy at the time, visited the crash site and knelt in prayer, offering apologies on behalf of the United States.

In Italy, where the event received the name of Strage del Cermis, the low-level flight was strongly criticized and some politicians called for a re-evaluation of rules or a complete ban of such exercises, though low-level flight was already illegal.

First trial
Italian prosecutors wanted the four marines to stand trial in Italy, but an Italian court recognized that North Atlantic Treaty Organization (NATO) treaties gave jurisdiction to U.S. military courts.

Initially, all four men on the plane were charged, but only the pilot, Captain Richard J. Ashby, and his navigator, Captain Joseph Schweitzer, actually faced trial, charged with twenty counts of involuntary manslaughter and negligent homicide. Ashby's trial took place at Marine Corps Base Camp Lejeune, North Carolina. It was determined that the maps on board did not show the cables and that the EA-6B was flying somewhat faster and considerably lower than allowed by military regulations. Ashby further claimed that the altitude-measuring equipment, the altimeter, on his plane had been malfunctioning, and that he had been unaware of the speed restrictions. In March 1999 the jury acquitted Ashby, outraging the Italian public. The manslaughter charges against Schweitzer were then dropped.

Second trial and re-examination
Ashby and Schweitzer were court-martialed a second time for obstruction of justice and conduct unbecoming an officer and a gentleman, because they had destroyed a videotape recorded on the plane the day of the disaster. The existence and destruction of this videotape only came to the attention of military investigators in August 1998; the other two members of the crew, Captains Chandler P. Seagraves and William L. Raney, received testimonial immunity and elected to disclose "the truth about everything".

Ashby and Schweitzer were found guilty in May 1999; both were dismissed from the service and Ashby received a six-month prison term. He was released after four and a half months for good behavior. Schweitzer made a plea agreement that came to full light after the military jury deliberated upon sentencing. His agreement prevented him from serving any prison time, but it did not prevent him from receiving a dismissal.

In their appeal, Ashby and Schweitzer asked for a re-examination of their trial and for clemency, challenging their dismissals in order to be eligible for military benefits. They claimed that during the first trial the prosecution and the defense secretly agreed to drop the involuntary manslaughter and negligent homicide charges, but to keep the obstruction of justice charge, in order to satisfy the requests coming from Italy. The appeal of Schweitzer was denied in November 2007. Decisions from the Court of Appeals for the Armed Forces were made available in August 2009.

U.S. official report
In a formal investigation report redacted on March 10, 1998, and signed by Lieutenant General Peter Pace, the U.S. Marine Corps agreed with the results of the Italian officers. The investigation was led by General Michael DeLong, along with Italian Colonels Orfeo Durigon and Fermo Missarino. The document was kept secret until the Italian newspaper La Stampa legally obtained a copy from the U.S. archives and published it on July 13, 2011.

The Marine aircrew was determined to be flying too low and too fast, putting themselves and others at risk. The investigation team suggested that disciplinary measures against the flight crew and commanding officers should be taken, that the U.S. had to bear the full blame for what happened, and that victims' relatives were entitled to receive a monetary settlement.

The commission found that the squadron was deployed at Aviano on August 27, 1997, before the publication of new directives by the Italian government forbidding flight below  in Trentino-Alto Adige. All the squadron's pilots received a copy of the directive. The letter was later found, unopened, in the cockpit of the EA-6B along with maps marking the cable car wire route. Directives were irrelevant here, since diving below cables was prohibited at all times regardless. In the report, the pilots are said to be usually well-behaved and sane, without any previous case of drug abuse or psychological stress. Nevertheless, on January 24, they had received a formal warning for flying too low after a training take-off.

On February 2, Schweitzer planned the flight route for a low-altitude training mission using obsolete documents. The report included an interview with the commander of 31st Fighter Wing, who stated that Muegge confessed to him that he and his crew, save for Ashby, were aware of the current flight limitations. After approving the report, Pace suggested disciplinary measures be taken against the commanders as well.

On the morning of the disaster, the plane underwent maintenance due to a fault in the "G-meter", which measures g-forces; the unit was replaced. The radar altimeter was checked and reported to be in normal condition.

Ashby was qualified for low-altitude flights and prohibited from diving below cables at all times. His last training mission of that kind was flown over six months before, on July 3. The report includes flight tracing from a nearby AWACS airplane. The document reports a camcorder aboard the flight, but it was blank after Schweitzer had taken the original cassette and burned it afterwards. Schweitzer confessed in 2012 that he had burned the tape containing incriminating evidence upon returning to Aviano Air Base.

Compensation
In May 1999, the U.S. Congress rejected a bill that would have set up a $40 million compensation fund for the victims.
In December 1999, the Italian Parliament approved a monetary compensation plan for the families ($1.9 million per victim). NATO treaties obligated the U.S. government to pay 75% of this compensation, which it did.

See also
1959 Okinawa F-100 crash
1960 Munich C-131 crash
1964 Machida F-8 crash
1968 Thule Air Base B-52 crash
1976 Cavalese cable car crash
1977 Yokohama F-4 crash
1988 Remscheid A-10 crash
1990 Italian Air Force MB-326 crash
Cable car accidents and disasters by death toll

References

Accidents and incidents involving United States Navy and Marine Corps aircraft
Anti-Americanism
Aviation accidents and incidents in Italy
Cavalese cable car crash
Non-combat military accidents
Cable car disasters
Transport disasters in Italy
Cavalese cable car crash
History of the Italian Republic
United States Marine Corps in the 20th century
United States Marine Corps aviation
History of Trentino
Italy–United States military relations
Cavalese cable car crash
Cavalese cable car crash
Cavalese cable car crash
1998 disasters in Italy